Kacheguda railway station (station code: KCG) is one of the three Central Stations in Hyderabad City of Telangana in India. It is currently operated by the South Central Railway zone of Indian Railways. The station was first built during the period of Nizam Osman Ali Khan to create wider connectivity for the state to Western cities like Mumbai through the railway junction at Wadi.

Endowed with central and side domes and accompanying minarets, this station has aspects of Gothic-style architecture. The station handles trains originating for Indore, Bhopal, Aurangabad, Tirupati, Bangalore, Mysuru, Chennai, Delhi, Nanded, Nizamabad, Mangalore, Madurai, and more. Housing many modern passenger amenities, this station now serves as the Headquarters station of the Hyderabad railway division of South Central Railway.

In addition to the new terminus building that is constructed which also houses a miniature Rail museum and branded outlets like Café Coffee Day the Zonal Railway has identified the station for development of Multi Functional Complex adjoining to the station building.

The facility is getting developed on PPP basis and the bidding process is over and the private concessionaire has been appointed for the project.

History
Constructed in 1916, by the Nizam of Hyderabad Asaf Jah VII, this Station was the Headquarters of the then Nizam's Guaranteed State Railway. It is believed that name Kachiguda Railway Station was given because of the Kachhi Community which has a good population residing close to the station.  The Kachhis came as infantry and cavalry soldiers from Bundelkhand in the times of Alamgir and earlier Kings.

Classification 
Kacheguda railway station is classified as an A1–category station in the Hyderabad railway division.

Originating express trains

MMTS connectivity 

The Kacheguda railway station connects Hyderabad City with MMTS Rail Transit, and localities like Kachiguda, Barkatpura, Chaderghat, Narayanguda, Kothi and Abids are accessible from this station.

Secunderabad–Falaknuma route (SF Line)

Trains
This station has four pit lines for primary maintenance of trains which are originating from here.

See also
South Central Railway zone
Secunderabad Junction railway station
Hyderabad Deccan railway station
Begumpet railway station
Lingampally railway station
Falaknuma railway station
Malkajgiri railway station

References

External links

MMTS Timings as per South Central Railway

MMTS stations in Hyderabad
Hyderabad railway division
Railway stations opened in 1916
1916 establishments in India
Indian Railway A1 Category Stations